The Division of Brisbane is an Australian electoral division in the state of Queensland.

History

The division was proclaimed in 1900, and was one of the original 65 divisions to be contested at the first federal election. It is named after the city of Brisbane.

It was in Labor hands for all but five years from 1931 to 2010, and for most of that time was a marginal Labor seat. However, a redistribution ahead of the 2010 election pushed the seat into more conservative-leaning territory east of Breakfast Creek. This helped Liberal Party challenger Teresa Gambaro take the seat from Labor incumbent Arch Bevis, marking the first time in over a century that Labor had been in government without holding Brisbane. She was re-elected in 2013 with an increased majority.

Gambaro did not re-contest the seat at the 2016 election. The contest was historic in that it was the first Australian federal election where both major party candidates in a lower house seat contest were openly gay – Trevor Evans for the Liberal Nationals and Pat O'Neill for Labor. Evans retained the seat for the LNP. Evans was re-elected in 2019 despite being the only incumbent Liberal National MP to suffer a swing against them at that election.

The seat of Brisbane has a growing Greens vote, with the party being only 2.12% short of overtaking the Labor Party on primary vote and thus likely entering the two-party preferred vote. The Greens won 2 booths at the 2019 federal election (Kelvin Grove and Spring Hill) and came second in a further 9 booths. The increase in the Greens vote in Brisbane has come largely at the expense of the Labor Party, with their vote having dropped by 22.47% from 1993, when the Greens first contested Brisbane, to 2019, where the Greens received 22.37% of the overall vote. In the 2022 federal election, Greens candidate Stephen Bates won the seat. The party also won the neighboring divisions of Ryan and Griffith.

Boundaries
On its original boundaries, Brisbane covered all of what is now the northern part of the City of Brisbane, but successive boundary changes cut it back to the inner suburban area. However, between 1913 to 1949 the seat instead covered the inner south-west.

Since 1984, federal electoral division boundaries in Australia have been determined at redistributions by a redistribution committee appointed by the Australian Electoral Commission. Redistributions occur for the boundaries of divisions in a particular state, and they occur every seven years, or sooner if a state's representation entitlement changes or when divisions of a state are malapportioned.

It now extends from the city centre into the western suburbs, and includes the Brisbane CBD, Alderley, Ashgrove, Bowen Hills, Clayfield, Enoggera, Ferny Grove, Fortitude Valley, Gaythorne, Grange, Herston, Kelvin Grove, Keperra, Milton, Mitchelton, New Farm, Newmarket, Newstead,  Teneriffe, Red Hill, Spring Hill, Upper Kedron, Wilston, Windsor, Gordon Park, Wooloowin, Lutwyche, parts of Bardon, Everton Park, Paddington and Stafford.

In the 2009 redistribution announced by the Australian Electoral Commission, the suburbs of Hendra, Ascot and Hamilton were included in the seat of Brisbane.

Members

Election results

References

External links
 Division of Brisbane (Qld) – Australian Electoral Commission

Electoral divisions of Australia
Constituencies established in 1901
1901 establishments in Australia
Brisbane
Brisbane